Benjamin Franklin Guiney (November 16, 1858 – December 5, 1930), was an American professional baseball player, who played in  and  with the Detroit Wolverines, of the National League. He batted right and left and threw right-handed. Guiney had a .083 career batting average, with one career hit in 12 at-bats.

He was born and died in Detroit, Michigan.

External links

 Ben Guiney Memorial at Find A Grave

1858 births
1930 deaths
Major League Baseball catchers
Baseball players from Michigan
Detroit Wolverines players
Ironton (minor league baseball) players
19th-century baseball players